Leonid Illarionovich Ivanov (Russian: Леонид Илларионович Иванов; 8 August 1909 – 27 June 1941) was a Soviet Air Force senior lieutenant and posthumous Hero of the Soviet Union. Ivanov was posthumously awarded the title for reportedly shooting down two German aircraft in the first days after Operation Barbarossa, the German invasion of the Soviet Union in World War II, and being killed in a ramming attack (taran) while defending his airfield from a  raid.

Early life
Leonid Ivanov was born on 8 August 1909 in Kashira. After graduating from seven years of railway school, Ivanov took adult education courses while working as a laborer at the Kashira tram park. In the summer of 1930 he began working at the Krasny Proletary (Red Proletarian) Machine Tool Factory in Moscow as a milling machine operator. He took night school courses at the STANKIN Machine Tool Institute.

In May 1932, Ivanov was drafted into the Red Army. He graduated from the 7th Stalingrad Military Aviation School in 1935. Ivanov became a fighter pilot in the Leningrad Military District aviation wing  and later served in the Far East at Khabarovsk. He was transferred to the 147th Fighter Aviation Regiment at Murmansk and fought in the Winter War between February and March 1940. In February 1941, he was awarded the Order of the Badge of Honour.

World War II
In June 1941 Ivanov was  commander of the 4th Squadron in the 147th Fighter Aviation Regiment (:ru:147-й истребительный авиационный полк), 1st Mixed Aviation Division (:ru:1-я смешанная авиационная дивизия), 14th Army, which was equipped with Polikarpov I-153 and stationed on the Karelian Front (reportedly based at Murmashi) with the task of defending the harbours of Arkhangelsk and Murmansk. On 25 June, he and his wingman Lieutenant Filimonov damaged two Junkers Ju 88s over Kandalaksha, and the next day he damaged a Heinkel He 111 over the same region. On 26 June he shot down a Messerschmitt Bf 110.  On 27 June he attacked seven Messerschmitt Bf 109s alone. Ivanov reportedly claimed three victories before he rammed a fourth. These losses cannot be verified in German sources.

Ivanov was buried in Afrikanda. On 22 July 1941, he was posthumously awarded the title Hero of the Soviet Union and the Order of Lenin.

Legacy 
A fishing trawler was named after Ivanov.

References

Soviet Air Force officers
1909 births
1941 deaths
Soviet military personnel killed in World War II
Aviators killed by being shot down
Soviet World War II pilots
People from Kashira
Pilots who performed an aerial ramming
Heroes of the Soviet Union